Damien English (born 21 February 1978) is an Irish Fine Gael politician who has been a Teachta Dála (TD) for the Meath West constituency since 2007, and previously from 2002 to 2007 for the Meath constituency. He served as Minister of State from 2014 to 2023.

Early and personal life
English was educated at Bohermeen National School in County Meath, and went on to attend Kells Community School. He further studied and part qualified with the Chartered Institute of Management Accountants at the Dublin Institute of Technology and Dublin Business School. He is married to Laura, and they have one son and three daughters.

Political career
English first entered politics when he was elected to Meath County Council in 1999, for the local electoral area of Navan, where he was the youngest council member.

At the 2002 general election, he was elected to the 29th Dáil as a Fine Gael TD for the Meath constituency, along with his Fine Gael colleague John Bruton. He was the youngest TD in the 29th Dáil, aged 24 years.

English was elected secretary of the Fine Gael parliamentary party in September 2002, and became the party deputy Spokesperson for Arts, Sports and Tourism. In October 2004, he was appointed deputy Spokesperson for Justice and Community Affairs, with special responsibility for Drugs, Alcohol and Crime Prevention. He was a member of the British–Irish Parliamentary Assembly from 2002 to 2007. He served as deputy Spokesperson on Enterprise with special responsibility for Labour Affairs and Small Business from 2007 to 2010.

In January 2007, English was linked to a statement by fellow Fine Gael TD John Deasy, regarding Deasy's intention to run for the leadership of the party if Enda Kenny failed to bring the party into government following the 2007 general election. English dismissed these claims as being false.

He was party deputy Spokesperson for Finance, with special responsibility for Banking and Credit from October 2010 to March 2011.

On 15 July 2014, he was appointed as Minister of State at the Department of Jobs, Enterprise and Innovation and at the Department of Education and Skills with responsibility for Skills, Research and Innovation.

He served as Department of Housing, Planning, Community and Local Government with responsibility for Housing and Urban Renewal from May 2016 to June 2017. He served as Minister of State at the Department of Housing, Planning and Local Government with responsibility for Housing and Urban Development from June 2017 to June 2020.

In July 2020, he was appointed Minister of State at the Department of Enterprise, Trade and Employment with responsibility for Employment Affairs and Retail Businesses and Minister of State at the Department of Social Protection with responsibility for Redundancy and Insolvency Operations and Employer Services.

Ministerial resignation
In January 2023, news website The Ditch published a story claiming English failed to declare ownership of an existing home in his planning application for a new property in 2008. It also claimed he neglected to declare such ownership in the Dáil register of interests. He resigned as Minister of State on 12 January 2023.

References

External links

Damien English's page on the Fine Gael website

 

1978 births
Living people
Alumni of Dublin Institute of Technology
Alumni of Dublin Business School
Fine Gael TDs
Local councillors in County Meath
Members of the 29th Dáil
Members of the 30th Dáil
Members of the 31st Dáil
Members of the 32nd Dáil
Ministers of State of the 31st Dáil
Ministers of State of the 32nd Dáil
Young Fine Gael
Members of the 33rd Dáil
Ministers of State of the 33rd Dáil